The 2008 IIHF World Championship Division III tournament was held from March 31 to April 4, 2008, in Luxembourg City, Luxembourg at the Kockelscheuer ice rink. The tournament was contested by five nations who already qualified by way of last year's tournament and one nation which was determined after the conclusion of the Division III Qualification tournament.

Teams

Fixtures

Standings

External links
 2008 Division III at the IIHF

IIHF World Championship Division III
4
Ice
2008
ice
ice
ice
Sports competitions in Luxembourg City
2000s in Luxembourg City
March 2008 sports events in Europe
April 2008 sports events in Europe